Tabora Boys' Secondary School (popularly known as Tabora School or Tabora Boys') is a public school in Tanzania founded in 1922.

The school was established to educate sons of African Chiefs. Its students have been major players in the country's political, economic and social development. The first self-government cabinet in 1961 had eight ministers whose five were Taborans (popularly known as Waboyzia). 

Some authors argue that the "Tabora" factor was something that was considered when assigning individuals to particular position in the Government.

As a territorial government school, the school has had changes of its name at different times from Tabora School, Tabora Central School, Tanganyika Revolutionary School, Boys' Government Secondary School and finally Tabora Boys' Secondary School. At points the school had integrated the full military curriculum alongside a traditional education curriculum.

Among the famous people who studied at this school are Rashidi Kawawa and the father of the Tanzanian nation, Mwalimu Julius Nyerere. Nyerere described Tabora School as the "Eton of Africa," the description led to the adoption of 'Etonian Grandeur of Tabora' as the name of Tabora School students.

References

Secondary schools in Tanzania
Boys' schools in Tanzania
20th-century establishments in Tanzania